Sumpitan may refer to:

 Sumpit, a traditional blowgun weapon from the Philippines, Borneo, and Sulawesi
 Sumpitan (ship), a ship formerly the Empire Seafarer, scrapped 1965